The 1973 Eastern Illinois Panthers football team represented Eastern Illinois University as an independent during the 1973 NCAA Division II football season. The Panthers played their home games at O'Brien Stadium in Charleston, Illinois.

Schedule

References

Eastern Illinois
Eastern Illinois Panthers football seasons
Eastern Illinois Panthers football